Tash is the surname of the following people:
Altun Tash (died 1032), Central Asian Shah
Lola Tash (born 1993), Canadian actress
Maria Tash, American jeweler 
Nolan Tash (born 1977), volleyball player from Trinidad and Tobago
Paul Tash (born 1954), American journalist

See also
Teymourtash (surname)